Zachary Robert Thomas (born May 26, 1998) is an American football offensive tackle for the Los Angeles Rams of the National Football League (NFL). He played college football at San Diego State and was drafted in the sixth round of the 2022 NFL Draft by the Bears.

Professional career

Chicago Bears
Thomas was drafted by the Chicago Bears with the 186th pick in the sixth round of the 2022 NFL Draft. He was waived on August 31, 2022 and re-signed to the practice squad.

Los Angeles Rams
On November 18, 2022, Thomas signed with the Los Angeles Rams from the practice squad of the Chicago Bears.

References

External links
 Chicago Bears bio
 San Diego State Aztecs bio

1998 births
Living people
Players of American football from California
Sportspeople from Carlsbad, California
American football offensive linemen
San Diego State Aztecs football players
Chicago Bears players
Los Angeles Rams players